United Nations Security Council resolution 1506, adopted on 12 September 2003, after recalling resolutions 731 (1992), 748 (1992), 883 (1993) and 1192 (1998) concerning the destruction of Pan Am Flight 103 over Lockerbie, Scotland in 1988 and UTA Flight 772 over Niger in 1989, the council lifted sanctions against Libya imposed after the country failed to co-operate with investigations into the destruction of the aircraft.

The Security Council welcomed steps the Libyan government had taken to comply with Security Council resolutions concerning the acceptance of responsibility of Libyan officials, compensation payments, renouncing terrorism and a commitment to co-operate with further requests for information in the investigation. Acting under Chapter VII of the United Nations Charter, the council lifted prohibitions–ban on military sales, air communications and certain oil equipment–imposed in previous resolutions concerning Libya and dissolved the committee established to monitor the sanctions.

The resolution, proposed by Bulgaria and the United Kingdom, concluded by removing the issue from the matters with which the council was seized. It was adopted by 13 votes to none against and two abstentions from France and the United States which expressed reservations about Libya's willingness to follow through with its commitments. Libyan state radio hailed the move as a "victory".

See also
 Foreign relations of Libya
 Investigation into the bombing of Pan Am Flight 103
 List of United Nations Security Council Resolutions 1501 to 1600 (2003–2005)

References

External links
 
Text of the Resolution at undocs.org

 1506
2003 in Libya
 1506
United Nations Security Council sanctions regimes
September 2003 events
Sanctions against Libya